The 2008 Canoe Slalom World Cup was a series of seven races in 4 canoeing and kayaking categories organized by the International Canoe Federation (ICF). It was the 21st edition. The series consisted of 4 continental championships (Africa, Oceania, Pan American and Asia) which were open to all countries and 3 world cup races. The athletes gained points for their results in the three world cup races plus their best result from any of the four continental championships.

Calendar

Final standings 

The winner of each race was awarded 50 points. Paddlers outside the top 20 in the C2 event and outside the top 40 in the other 3 events were awarded 2 points for participation. If two or more athletes or boats were equal on points, the ranking was determined by their positions in the final world cup race.

Results

2008 African Championships 

The first African Canoe Slalom Championships were held in Sagana, Kenya on January 27. USA won the medal table with 2 golds and a bronze.

Oceania Championships 2008 

The 2008 Oceania Championships were held in Penrith, Australia on March 15–16. Slovakia won 2 golds a silver and a bronze to top the medal table.

2008 Pan American Championships 

The 2008 Pan American Championships took place in Charlotte, USA on April 26. The home athletes dominated the medal table by winning 3 golds, 4 silvers and 3 bronzes.

2008 Asia Canoe Slalom Championships 

The 2008 Asia Canoe Slalom Championships were the last of the continental championships to count for the world cup. The event took place in Nakhon Nayok, Thailand on May 17–18. China won the medal table with 2 golds, 2 silvers and 4 bronzes.

World Cup Race 1 

The main part of the world cup series got under way in Prague, Czech Republic on June 20–22. France and Czech Republic shared the top spot in the medal table with both countries winning 2 golds and 1 bronze medal.

World Cup Race 2 

The penultimate race of the series took place in Tacen, Slovenia on June 28–29. Two gold medals were enough for Germany to win the medal table. Slovenia took one gold courtesy of Peter Kauzer.

World Cup Race 3 

The world cup series closed in Augsburg, Germany on July 4–6. Australia was the most successful country with 2 golds. The German paddlers won 1 gold and 1 bronze medal.

References

External links 
 International Canoe Federation

Canoe Slalom World Cup
Canoe Slalom World Cup